Work: A Story of Experience, first published in 1873, is a semi-autobiographical novel by Louisa May Alcott, the author of Little Women, set in the times before and after the American Civil War.

It is one of several nineteenth-century novels that show "the changes in women's work in the new industrial era, as well as the dilemmas, tensions, and the meaning of that work".Alcott takes her heroine, Christie Devon, through a variety of careers, from the domestic to the dramatic to the depressing, until Christie finds the balance between public and private work and between work for her own profit and work for the profit of others.[...] Alcott portrays work outside the home (which is fundamentally public) as potentially dangerous to a woman's reputation, health, and identity[... and] work inside the home (which is fundamentally private) as healing and regenerative, but ultimately unsatisfying to an ambitious woman like Christie.The character David Sterling is loosely based on Alcott's friend, Henry David Thoreau.

Footnotes

External links 
 
 

1873 American novels
American autobiographical novels
Novels by Louisa May Alcott